Pak Yong-hui ( or  ; born August 24, 1970 in Pyongyang) is a North Korean sport shooter. She won two silver medals in the women's trap at the 2002 Asian Games in Busan, South Korea, and at the 2008 ISSF World Cup series in Beijing, with scores of 83 and 90 targets, respectively.

Pak represented North Korea at the 2008 Summer Olympics in Beijing, where she competed in women's trap shooting. She finished only in eighteenth place by one point behind South Africa's Diane Swanton, for a total score of 56 targets.

References

External links
NBC 2008 Olympics profile

North Korean female sport shooters
Trap and double trap shooters
Living people
Olympic shooters of North Korea
Shooters at the 2008 Summer Olympics
Shooters at the 2016 Summer Olympics
Asian Games medalists in shooting
Sportspeople from Pyongyang
1970 births
Shooters at the 1990 Asian Games
Shooters at the 1998 Asian Games
Shooters at the 2002 Asian Games
Shooters at the 2006 Asian Games
Shooters at the 2010 Asian Games
Shooters at the 2014 Asian Games
Shooters at the 2018 Asian Games
Asian Games gold medalists for North Korea
Asian Games silver medalists for North Korea
Asian Games bronze medalists for North Korea
Medalists at the 1990 Asian Games
Medalists at the 2002 Asian Games
Medalists at the 2006 Asian Games
Medalists at the 2010 Asian Games
Medalists at the 2014 Asian Games
21st-century North Korean women